The 2022 Erbil missile attacks occurred on 13 March 2022 when multiple ballistic missile were launched by the Islamic Revolutionary Guard Corps from East Azerbaijan province, Iran, against the city of Erbil in Kurdistan Region, Iraq.

Fateh-110 ballistic missiles were reportedly launched from Iran. The IRGC said that the target was Israel's "strategic center" in Erbil. Kurdish authorities reported that among the places hit by the missiles were the city's American consulate and a residential neighbourhood. One civilian was injured by the attack. According to one US official, the targets encompassed buildings where a Mossad cell was suspected of operating, according to a conversation with an Iraqi counterpart.

The next day, the Islamic Revolutionary Guard Corps claimed responsibility for the attack.

Background
A few days before, IRGC released a statement promising Israel will pay for the killings of Ehsan Karbalaipour and Morteza Saeidnejad, two IRGC colonels killed in an Israeli airstrike in the outskirts of Damascus in Syria on 7 March. Major General Hossein Salami, IRGC Commander-in-Chief and General Amir Ali Hajizadeh attended their funerals.

The attack
The ballistic missiles struck the target at 1:20 a.m., the same time of the assassination of Major General Qasem Soleimani by a United States drone strike in 2020.

Reactions
On Sunday, Iraq summoned the ambassador of Iran to protest the missile attack, denouncing a "flagrant violation of (Iraqi) sovereignty," Iraq protested over the missile strikes that had caused "material losses" and "damage to civilian installations and houses."

Iraqi Shiite cleric Muqtada al-Sadr responded to the attack by tweeting "The territory of Iraq from south to north, and east to west should not be part of conflicts and that Iraq's "involvement" in conflicts was a dangerous precedent, while calling on the competent authorities to immediately send a protest letter to the United Nations and additionally to summon the Iranian ambassador.

The airstrikes were also denounced by Prime Minister of Iraq Mustafa Al-Kadhimi, the United States Department of State, President of Iraq Barham Salih and Iraqi Kurdish former president Masoud Barzani, the latter two of whom described it as a terrorist attack.

Qais al-Khazali, leader of Asa'ib Ahl al-Haq which is a radical Iraqi Shi'a political party and paramilitary group praised the airstrike, claiming to have information about the Israeli presence and that what was bombed in Erbil was the headquarters of Mossad. He also stated that even if Mohammed bin Salman decided to bomb an Israeli headquarters in Iraq, "[he] would not condemn this". On 21 March, Jafar al-Husseini, the spokesperson for Iraq’s Kataib Hezbollah movement, warned that activities by the Israeli spy agency Mossad in the semi-autonomous Kurdistan region could trigger a conflict between Iraq and its neighbors.

Israel's officials declined to comment.

See also
 2004 Erbil bombings
 2005 Erbil bombing
 2013 Erbil bombings
 2021 Erbil rocket attacks
 Operation Martyr Soleimani

References

2022 crimes in Iraq
Explosions in 2022
2022 in international relations
2020s building bombings
2022 in Iraqi Kurdistan
March 2022 crimes in Asia
March 2022 events in Iraq
Attacks on buildings and structures in 2022
Building bombings in Iraq
2022 rocket attacks
Military operations involving Iran
Iran–Israel proxy conflict
Iran–Iraq relations
Iran–United States relations
Iraq–United States relations
Iraq–Israel relations
Israel–United States relations